Ocenotrophon is a genus of sea snails, marine gastropod mollusks in the family Muricidae, the murex snails or rock snails.

Species
Species within the genus Ocenotrophon include:

 Ocenotrophon painei (Dall, 1904)

References

Ocenebrinae
Monotypic gastropod genera